The 1949 Florida State Seminoles football team represented Florida State University as a member of the Dixie Conference during the 1949 college football season. Led by second-year head coach Don Veller, the Seminoles compiled an overall record of 9–1 with a mark of 4–0 in conference play, winning the Dixie Conference title for the second consecutive season. The Seminoles were invited to the program's first bowl game, the Cigar Bowl, where they defeated  on January 2, 1950.

Schedule

References

Florida State
Florida State Seminoles football seasons
Cigar Bowl champion seasons
Florida State Seminoles football